Lavdrim Hajrulahu (born 7 March 1998) is a footballer who plays as a centre-back for Swiss club Lausanne Ouchy and the Kosovo national team.

International career
On 2 June 2021, Hajrulahu received an urgent call-up from Kosovo for the friendly matches against Guinea and Gambia. Six days later, he made his debut with Kosovo in a friendly match against Guinea after coming on as a substitute at 46th minute in place of Bajram Jashanica.

References

External links

1998 births
Living people
Sportspeople from Lausanne
Kosovan footballers
Kosovo international footballers
Swiss men's footballers
Swiss people of Kosovan descent
Swiss people of Albanian descent
Association football central defenders
Swiss Promotion League players
Swiss Challenge League players
FC Stade Lausanne Ouchy players